Yelizaveta Mikhaylovna Suvorova (born 21 April 1975) is a Russian modern pentathlete. She represented Russia at the 2000 Summer Olympics held in Sydney, Australia in the women's modern pentathlon and she finished in 7th place.

References

External links 
 

1975 births
Living people
Sportspeople from Moscow
Russian female modern pentathletes
Olympic modern pentathletes of Russia
Modern pentathletes at the 2000 Summer Olympics